The Kunama languages are a family of languages traditionally considered dialects of a single language, spoken in western Eritrea and across the border in Ethiopia. They are included as a branch of the Nilo-Saharan language family. The languages are Kunama proper and Ilit.

References

Blench, Roger. Nilo-Saharan languages list.

 
Language families
Languages of Eritrea